Gregory Sebastian Fitzsimmons (born April 5, 1966) is an American stand-up comedian, writer, producer and radio host. He hosted The Greg Fitzsimmons Show on Howard 101 until December 2018.

Life and early career
Fitzsimmons was born in New York City, New York, to New York City radio personality Bob Fitzsimmons, and Patricia Marie Judith ( McCarthy) Fitzsimmons. He grew up in Tarrytown, New York.

He began his stand-up comedy career while attending Boston University, where he earned his undergraduate degree. He has appeared on such programs as The Tonight Show with Jay Leno, Late Show with David Letterman, Late Night with Conan O'Brien, Chelsea Lately, The Howard Stern Show and his one-hour Comedy Central special "Life on Stage".   In 2001 he won "The Jury Award for Best Comedian" at The HBO US Comedy Arts Festival in Aspen, Colorado.

Broadcasting and television career
Fitzsimmons has a highly-rated comedy podcast called "Fitzdog Radio". He  was a frequent guest on The Howard Stern Show on Sirius Satellite Radio, and hosted his own show on Howard 101, The Greg Fitzsimmons Show. He also frequent guested on The Adam Carolla Podcast and the Joe Rogan Experience.

As an actor, he has appeared on Louie, C.S.I., Comedy Bang Bang, Aqua Teen Hunger Force, and the film Division III: Football's Finest, and "Santa Clarita Diet."
In 1996, Fitzsimmons hosted the MTV game show Idiot Savants, which won a Cable Ace Award. He was a regular commentator on Vh1's Best Week Ever, I Love The series and Tough Crowd w/ Colin Quinn. In 2014 he starred in TruTV's How to Be a Grownup and became a recurring panelist on @midnight on Comedy Central.

He voiced Randy in the Aqua Teen Hunger Force episode "Rabbit, Not Rabbot" as well as guest-starred on Crashing.

The Greg Fitzsimmons Show was a talk radio program hosted by American stand-up comic, actor, writer, and television producer, Greg Fitzsimmons. The Greg Fitzsimmons Show was uncensored and featured on Sirius XM Satellite Radio, on Howard Stern's Howard 101.  The radio program was first transmitted in 2006 and continues to be broadcast live on Monday nights at 9 pm PST/11:59 pm EST.  A rebroadcast of the show is "replayed" throughout the week on Howard 101 & cancelled December 4, 2018 due to "programming changes"

Unlike most shows on Sirius XM Radio, which are broadcast out of Sirius headquarters in New York City, The Greg Fitzsimmons Show is broadcast from Fitzsimmons' DogHouse Studios in Venice Beach, California or at Sirius' Los Angeles studio in Hollywood, California.

Mike Gibbons (aka "Gibby"), who is also a comedy writer and television producer, is Fitzsimmons' sidekick/producer.  Gibbons is a long-time friend of Fitzsimmons, which allows for natural, quick-witted banter between the two men, and occasional disagreements that are hashed out on-air.  The executive producer is Jim McClure (NY), and associate producers are Cori Lahners (CA) and Mike Farese (NY).

The show features interviews with celebrities, musical guests and comedians, and listener call-ins encouraged throughout the show.  As veteran comedy writers, Fitzsimmons and Gibbons offer a unique perspective on Hollywood and a behind-the-scenes look at the industry.  Their experience and insight provide a notable twist to celebrity interviews.

In 2018, he launched a new podcast Childish with comedian Alison Rosen.

Writing
From 2003 to 2005, he was a writer and producer on The Ellen DeGeneres Show for which he won four Daytime Emmys. He went on to write for Louis C.K.'s sitcom Lucky Louie. He also wrote for the Emmy Awards, Politically Incorrect with Bill Maher, Cedric the Entertainer Presents, The Man Show, The Wanda Sykes Show, The Gong Show with Dave Attell and The Chelsea Handler Show.

He was a writer on HBO's Crashing.

Books

References

External links
Official site

News articles and interviews

1966 births
20th-century American comedians
21st-century American comedians
American male comedians
American podcasters
American stand-up comedians
American talk radio hosts
American game show hosts
Television producers from New York City
American television writers
Boston University alumni
Comedians from New York City
Living people
American male television writers
Screenwriters from New York (state)
American people of Irish descent